Princess Masha (French:  Princesse Masha) is a 1927 French silent film directed by René Leprince and starring Claudia Victrix, Jean Toulout and Romuald Joubé.

The film's sets were designed by the art director Robert Mallet-Stevens.

Cast
 Claudia Victrix as Masha 
 Jean Toulout as Général Tcherkoff 
 Romuald Joubé as Roger Lantenac 
 André Marnay as Krivoshine 
 Andrée Brabant as Juana Gallardo 
 Fernande Raynal
 Paul Guidé as Colonel Goubiesky 
 Jean Peyrière as Kerdiakoff 
 Raphaël Lievin as Vakirschef 
 Boris de Fast as Tzerem Lama 
 Hugues de Bagratide
 Édouard Hardoux as Piotre Ivanoff

References

Bibliography
 Rège, Philippe. Encyclopedia of French Film Directors, Volume 1. Scarecrow Press, 2009.

External links

1927 films
Films directed by René Leprince
French silent films
French black-and-white films
French drama films
Pathé films
Silent drama films
1920s French films